Sergio Ramos (born 1986) is a Spanish professional footballer.

Sergio Ramos may also refer to:
Sérgio Ramos (basketball) (born 1975), Portuguese basketball coach and former player
Sergio Ramos (water polo) (born 1941), Mexican water polo player